Huangshan Tunxi International Airport  is an airport in Tunxi District, Huangshan City, Anhui Province. It mainly serves tourists to Mount Huangshan, one of China's top tourist destinations.  The airport was first built in 1958 and has one 2,600-meter runway.

Airlines and destinations

Passenger

Controversies
According to reports from CCTV, taxicabs in Huangshan Airport price themselves out of the market without using the meters legally, and other taxis in downtown Huangshan are rejected for taking passengers.

See also
List of airports in China

References

External links
Official web site

Airports in Anhui
Huangshan City